Suresh Venapally (born 1966) is an Indian mathematician known for his research work in algebra. He is a professor at Emory University.

Background

Suresh was born in Vangoor, Telangana, India and studied in ZPHS at Vangoor up to 9th standard. He did his M.Sc at University of Hyderabad.
He joined Tata Institute of Fundamental Research (TIFR) in 1989 and got his PhD in under the guidance of Raman Parimala (1994).  He later joined the faculty at University of Hyderabad.

Honors

 Shanti Swarup Bhatnagar Award for Mathematical Sciences in 2009
 Invited speaker at the International Congress of Mathematicians held at Hyderabad, India in 2010
 Fellow of the Indian Academy of Sciences
 Andhra Pradesh Scientist Award, 2008
 B. M. Birla Science prize, 2004
 INSA Medal for Young Scientists, 1997

Selected publications

 1995: "Zero-cycles on quadric fibrations: finiteness theorems and the cycle map", Invent. Math. 122, 83–117 (with Raman Parimala) 
 1998: "Isotropy of quadratic forms over function fields in one variable over p-adic fields", Publ. de I.H.E.S. 88, 129–150 (with Raman Parimala)  
 2001: Hermitian analogue of a theorem of Springer", J.Alg. 243(2), 780-789 (with Raman Parimala and Ramaiyengar Sridharan) 
 2010: "Bounding the symbol length in the Galois cohomology of function field of p-adic curves", Comm. Math. Helv. 85(2), 337–346 , "The u-invariant of the function fields of p-adic curves" Ann. Math. 172(2), 1391-1405 (with Raman Parimala)

References

External links
 Emory University faculty web page 
 University of Hyderabad faculty web page
 

20th-century Indian mathematicians
Algebraists
Living people
Emory University faculty
1966 births
Tata Institute of Fundamental Research alumni
Scientists from Telangana
Recipients of the Shanti Swarup Bhatnagar Award in Mathematical Science